Drums is a studio album by American hip hop group Oddjobs. It was released November 9, 2002  on Third Earth Music.

Reception 
The album was generally well received, with Stanton Swihart of AllMusic saying: "Drums brilliantly roams through a broad range of styles, from cunning metaphysical puzzles to dark, speculative meditations."

Track listing

References

External links 
 Drums at Discogs

Hip hop albums by American artists
2002 albums